Esade (Escola Superior d'Administració i Direcció d'Empreses) is a prestigious international private educational institution based in Barcelona, Spain. Esade runs two schools of the university, Esade Business School and Esade Law School, as well as a language center, the Esade Executive Language Center.  The school has also formed a strategic alliance with the Ramon Llull University in its undergraduate programmes in Law and Business. ESADE is ranked among the world's top business schools and law school programs by the Financial Times, The Economist, Forbes, QS World University Rankings and more.

History 

The Esade project was conceived in the spring of 1954 by a group of Spanish professionals and entrepreneurs who later founded the university. The school signed an agreement with the Jesuits (Societas Iesu) in October 1958 and started offering its first academic programs in a small building in the district of Sant Gervasi, Barcelona.

In 1958, Esade was ultimately founded. Two years later, in 1960, executive education programmes were introduced. In 1964 the college's MBA programme was established. A year later, in 1965, ESADE's Barcelona campus (Av. Pedralbes) opened (Building I), as well as the Executive Language Centre. In 1993, Esade Law School opened. In 2001, the school inaugurated its campus in Madrid (Chamartín). In 2009 Esade opened a new campus in Sant Cugat (Barcelona) as well as Esade Creapolis, a technology park based on open innovation and situated on the new Sant Cugat campus.

Today Esade's campuses, if the premises in both Madrid and Barcelona are included, cover an area of 30,000m2.

Esade Creapolis

Esade Creapolis is a joint venture between Esade, a consortium of Spanish financial institutions, local government institutions and business associations. The organisation manages a technology and innovation park on the Esade campus in Sant Cugat, Barcelona. It is an open innovation center promoted by Esade business school, where companies, students, the academic community and scientists come together with the aim of promoting both creativity and innovation. Between 2005 and 2008 Esade Creapolis invested €70 Million in its facilities in Sant Cugat and has since become home to various start-ups.

International Rankings

Notable alumni
Enrique Lores (born 1964/65), CEO of HP Inc.
Ramon Laguarta (born 1964), CEO of PepsiCo
Ferran Soriano (born 1967), CEO of Manchester City F.C.
Joaquin Duato (born 1962), CEO of Johnson & Johnson
Gabriel Escarrer Jaume (born 1971), Founder and CEO of Meliá Hotels International
Xavier Espot Zamora (born 1979), Current Prime Minister of Andorra
Jaime Guardiola Romojaro (born 1957), CEO of Banco Sabadell
Ernesto Lucena (born 1978), Current Minister of Sports of Colombia
Javier Ferrán (born 1956), Chairman of Diageo
Albert Rivera (born 1979), Spanish politician
Josep Maria Bartomeu (born 1963), Former President of FC Barcelona
Joan Rigol (born 1943), Former President of the Parliament of Catalonia
Iñaki Urdangarin (born 1968), Retired Spanish handball player
Albert Ollé Bartolomé (born 1964), Pioneer of the Call and Contact Center industry in Spain
Assumpta Escarp i Gibert (born 1957), Member of the Parliament of Catalonia for the Province of Barcelona
Javier Faus (born 1964), Chairman and CEO of Meridian Capital Partners
Eva Granados (born 1975), Deputy of the Parliament of Catalonia for the Socialists' Party of Catalonia
Sabina Fluxà (born 1980), Vice-Chairman and CEO of Iberostar Hotels & Resorts
Patricia Gras (born 1960), American journalist, television anchor, reporter and producer
Jordi Hereu (born 1965), 117th Mayor of Barcelona
Alessandro Magnoli Bocchi (born 1968), Italian economist
Irene Rigau (born 1951), Former Counselor of Education of Catalonia
Sandro Rosell (born 1964), Former President of FC Barcelona
Josep Maria Vallès (born 1940), Spanish academic and politician
Risto Mejide (born 1974), Publicist, author, music producer, songwriter, talent show judge and TV presenter

See also
 List of Jesuit sites

References

External links 

 Official website

 
Education in Barcelona
Educational institutions established in 1958
Jesuit universities and colleges in Spain
1958 establishments in Spain
University Ramon Llull